Alexander Peter Annan is an engineer whose research focuses on near-surface geophysics. He has made significant contributions to the development of ground-penetrating radar (GPR) technology. Annan is the CEO of Sensors & Software, a company he founded to commercialize GPR technology. He has been working on the development of GPR since the 1970s and was one of the lead researchers on the surface electrical properties experiment conducted on the Moon during the Apollo 17 mission.

Early life and education 
Annan graduated from University of Toronto with a Bachelor of Applied Science degree in engineering science in 1968 and a Master of Science degree in geophysics in 1970. In 1972, Annan was one of the researchers on the surface electrical properties (SEP) experiment on the Apollo 17 mission to the Moon. SEP was the subject of Annan's graduate school research and used radio waves to scan as far as a few kilometres below the surface of the Moon.

In 1974, he earned his PhD in engineering science from Memorial University of Newfoundland. In his thesis, The Equivalent Source Method for Electromagnetic Scattering Analysis and Its Geophysical Application, Annan developed the PLATE program used in transient electromagnetics to mathematically model the electromagnetic response of finite thin conducting plates.

Career 
After earning his PhD, Annan began working as a research scientist at the Geological Survey of Canada. He then served as chief geophysicist at Barringer Research and senior engineering geophysicist at Golder Associates. During this time, he developed methods for the use of radio frequency to measure soil water content. In 1981, Annan founded A-Cubed to develop ground-penetrating radar (GPR) and airborne electromagnetic systems.

When the Waterloo Centre for Groundwater Research was founded at the University of Waterloo in 1987, Annan joined the centre as a part-time researcher and adjunct professor. Annan commercialized GPR systems by later forming Sensors & Software, a supplier of equipment for underground or subsurface surveying. He serves as CEO of Sensors & Software based in Mississauga, Ontario.

Annan has been a member of Society of Exploration Geophysicists (SEG) since 1969 and has received the SEG's Cecil Green Enterprise Award. At SEG, he served as chair of the Mining Committee, president of the Near-Surface Geophysics Section (NSGS), which he founded, and as editor of NSGS's newsletter Near Surface Views. In 1996, SEG awarded him the Hal Mooney Award for “scientific and technical excellence and innovation" in near-surface geophysics. He also served as second vice-president, and director-at-large for SEG. Annan is also a member of the Canadian Exploration Geophysical Society and lectured about near-surface geophysics in the society's KEGS Special Lecture program in 2015.

Selected publications

References

External links 

20th-century Canadian engineers
21st-century Canadian engineers
Engineers from Ontario
Canadian mining engineers
Year of birth missing (living people)
Living people